The United–Reform Coalition, also known as the National Political Federation from 1935, was a coalition between two of the three major parties of New Zealand, the United and Reform parties, from 1931 to 1936. The Coalition formed the Government of New Zealand from its formation in September 1931, successfully contesting and winning the 1931 general election in December. The Coalition was defeated at the 1935 general election by Labour. The following year the coalition was formalised by the formation of the modern New Zealand National Party.

Primarily the coalition was formed to deal with the Great Depression which began in 1929. The Labour Party refused to join the coalition, as it believed that the only solution to the depression was socialism.

History

Formation

The initial coalition between United and Reform had formed in September 1931, following the collapse of an earlier coalition between United and Labour. Fearing that splitting the anti-Labour vote would result in a Labour government even if it received fewer votes than United and Reform combined, the two centre-right parties formed a coalition and an election agreement. Part of the agreement was that all sitting members who support the coalition would in turn receive the official endorsement as coalition candidate.

In the subsequent election, the coalition won 54.0% of the popular vote, compared to 34.3% for Labour. Although Reform won 28 seats to United's 19, United leader George Forbes remained Prime Minister.

Defeat

The government focused primarily on getting New Zealand out of the depression by cutting government spending and thus balancing the national budget. It dealt with widespread unemployment by initiating relief work, which involved compelling the unemployed to work on a range of projects ranging from useful public works to pointless activity. The government was widely seen as heartless, encapsulated by the commonly believed but probably untrue story that Prime Minister George Forbes had told a delegation of unemployed men to go and eat grass. In the 1935 election, Labour won 46.1% of the popular vote, while the coalition won only 32.9%. However the result in terms of seats was an electoral wipeout, with Labour winning 53 seats to the coalition's 16. A further eleven seats were won by minor parties and independents.

Following their defeats, the United and Reform parties merged to become the National Party. The  and  showed the hazard of vote-splitting. In 1931 only 24 of 53 electorates where Labour stood had only one anti-Labour candidate: e.g.  had H. R. Mackenzie from United and John Allum from Reform, who together got little more than half the votes of the winner - Mickey Savage. And in  there were four anti-Labour candidates and the seat went back to Labour.

Electoral results

See also
 Governments of New Zealand

Notes and references

Citations

References 

Governments of New Zealand
New Zealand Liberal Party
Reform Party (New Zealand)
20th century in New Zealand
1931 establishments in New Zealand
1935 disestablishments in New Zealand
Cabinets established in 1931
Cabinets disestablished in 1935
Conservative liberal parties
Liberal conservative parties